In sociology, a system is said to be in social equilibrium when there is a dynamic working balance among its interdependent parts. Each subsystem will adjust to any change in the other subsystems and will continue to do so until an equilibrium is retained. The process of achieving equilibrium will only work if the changes happen slowly, but for rapid changes it would throw the social system into chaos, unless and until a new equilibrium can be reached.

See also 
 Open Society

References 

 Gilboa, Itzhak & Matsui, Akihiko, 1991. "Social Stability and Equilibrium", Econometrica, Econometric Society, vol. 59(3), pages 859-67, May.

Further reading 
 Batchelor, George, Social Equilibrium and Other Problems Ethical and Religious, G. H. Ellis, 1887
 Canning, David, "Social Equilibrium", Working Papers from Cambridge - Risk, Information & Quantity Signals, 1990
 de Córdoba, Gonzalo Fernández, "On the existence of a beliefs social equilibrium", Economics Letters, Volume 55, Issue 3, 12 September 1997, Pages 431-433
Social dynamics